Cullinan is a small town in the Gauteng province of South Africa. The town is named after diamond magnate Sir Thomas Cullinan.

History

In 1898 Sir Thomas Cullinan was handed a three carat diamond found along a farm fence. He studied the area and came to the conclusion that the diamond was washed down from a nearby hill. Sir Cullinan made an attempt to buy the land from the owner, Joachim Prinsloo, but did not succeed. After Prinsloo's death, he was able to purchase the land for £52,000 from Prinsloo's daughter. The Cullinan kimberlite was discovered in 1902 and in 1903 open pit mining commenced. The mine was named the Premier mine.

It was bought by the Transvaal government and presented to King Edward VII.

The town of Cullinan owes its existence to the diamond mining in this area, much like Kimberley in the Northern Cape Province of South Africa.

Geography

Cullinan is situated in the Highveld region of South Africa. The town has an elevation of 1476 m (4842.52 ft) and is located at −25.6709 [latitude in decimal degrees], 28.5236 [longitude in decimal degrees].

Government

Cullinan formed part of the Nokeng tsa Taemane Local Municipality until 18 May 2011. Due to mismanagement of funds, this municipality was disbanded and incorporated into the Tshwane Metropolitan Municipality.

Tourism

Tours

Various operators offer tours around Cullinan. Tourists can choose between tours around town, within the mining area and even underground mining tours. Various means of transportation is used to provide these tours, the most popular being on an open vehicle or on foot.

Museums

There are a few museums in the area in and around Cullinan. A few of the most popular ones are:

The History room Cullinan.
The McHardy house museum.
The Zonderwater Italian POW museum
The Sammy Marks Museum

Adventure

The mountainous terrain surrounding Cullinan offers multiple activities for more adventure-oriented people, like:
 Gorge gliding
 Horse riding
 Abseiling
 Bongo drum sessions
 Archery

There is also an annual mountain bike race called the Cullinan Diamond Rush.

Architecture

St. Georges Anglican church

The church was designed by British architect Herbert Baker, who was a dominant figure in South African architecture between 1892 and 1912.
The church was built in 1904 as the parish church for the miners. The church is a simple square structure with a corrugated iron roof. The first recorded meeting was held on April 22, 1906.

Cullinan hospital

The hospital was built in 1907, and was officially opened by Annie Cullinan, wife of Sir Thomas Cullinan. It served only the European miners back then, but now serves the need of all the people living in Cullinan. The hospital has since closed down.

Nedbank

The Nedbank building was built around 1908. The building is still in use today by the bank.

Masonic lodge

The Premier Diamond Masonic Lodge was consecrated in the Cullinan School Hall and met there until 1909 when the new lodge building was completed at a cost of £1200. A feature of the Lodge's history has been the number of times it has been forced into recess, whether because of war, as in 1914 to 1916, disturbances leading to martial law, 1921 to 1922, and the closing down of the diamond mine (the main source of members) during the depression, 1932 to 1941. However the Second World War saw military forces stationed on the mine and an adjoining farm and this helped the lodge to get restarted. Then in 1945 the mine was reopened, restoring 'normality' to Cullinan, and since then the lodge's progress has been steady and sound. The lodge is still in use and looks the same as it did 100 years ago, having been preserved by active members.

Climate

See also

 Rayton
 Petra Diamonds

References

External links
 
Cullinan Meander
Cullinan Gauteng

Populated places in the City of Tshwane
Mining communities in South Africa
Populated places established in 1903
1903 establishments in Transvaal Colony